The Lutheran Church of Saint Michael is a church built between 1874–1876 in Saint Petersburg's Vasiliyevski Island. The church in Gothic Revival style was designed by engineer Karl von Bulmering. The façade was renovated in 1886 with a design by Rudolf Berngard.

The church was first built for the use of a German Lutheran congregation with connections to the cadet school on the island set up in the 1700s. From 1929 to its closure in 1935, it was used by the Lutheran Church in Russia, now part of the Evangelical Lutheran Church in Russia, Ukraine, Kazakhstan and Central Asia. After its closure, it was given to the sports equipment factory. In the 1990s, the church was granted to a Russian-speaking congregation of the Lutheran Church of Ingria, which then renovated the building.

The address of the church is Sredni prospekt Vasiljevskogo ostrova 18. The nearest metro station is Vasileostrovskaja.

External links 

 The church's entry in the St Petersburg encyclopedia 
 The website of the congregation 

Lutheran churches in Saint Petersburg
Cultural heritage monuments of regional significance in Saint Petersburg
Gothic Revival church buildings in Russia